Blissville is a civil parish in Sunbury County, New Brunswick, Canada.

For governance purposes it was divided between CFB Gagetown and the local service district of the parish of Blissville, which is a member of Regional Service Commission 11 (RSC11).

Origin of name
The parish was probably named in honour of John Murray Bliss, senior justice of the Supreme Court of New Brunswick at the time the Act erecting the parish was passed in 1834 but died before it became effective in January 1835.

History
Blissville was erected in 1835 from Burton and Lincoln Parishes.

In 1874 Gladstone Parish was erected from the western part of Blissville.

In 1896 the land boundary with Gladstone was completely altered, adding a large area to Blissville; the boundary with Burton was altered along the Nerepis Road.

In 1949 the boundary with Burton was restored to its pre-1896 line.

Boundaries
Blissville Parish is bounded:

 on the north beginning at a point on the eastern bank of the Oromocto River about 1.2 kilometres downstream of the mouth of Shaw Creek, then running south 66º east to the Queens County line;
 on the southeast by the Sunbury County line;
 on the south by the Charlotte County;
 on the west by a line beginning at a point on the Charlotte County about 2.9 kilometres west of the South Oromocto Lake Road, then running north 67º east about 19.2 kilometres to the rear line of grants along the western side of the South Branch Oromocto River, then northerly about 2.2 kilometres along the rear line of grants to the northern line of a grant to Nathaniel Hubbard, which is also the southern boundary of Fredericton Junction, then easterly to the river, then down the South Branch Oromocto River and the Oromocto River to the starting point.

Communities
Communities at least partly within the parish; italics indicate a community expropriated for CFB Gagetown

 Blissville
 Central Blissville
 Germany
 Hoyt
 Hoyt Station
 Juvenile Settlement
 Mill Settlement
 Mill Settlement West
 Patterson
 Sand Brook
 Tweedsmuir

Bodies of water
Bodies of water at least partly in the parish:

 Oromocto River
 South Branch Oromocto River
 Brizley Stream
 Piskahegan Stream
 Back Creek
 Bass Creek
 White Birch Lake

Islands
Islands in the parish:
 Basley Island

Other notable places
Parks, historic sites, and other noteworthy places in the parish.
 CFB Gagetown

Demographics
Revised census figures based on the 2023 local governance reforms have not been released.

Population
Population trend

Language
Mother tongue  (2016)

Access Routes
Highways and numbered routes that run through the parish, including external routes that start or finish at the parish limits:

Highways

Principal Routes

Secondary Routes:

External Routes:
None

See also
List of parishes in New Brunswick

Notes

References

Parishes of Sunbury County, New Brunswick
Local service districts of Sunbury County, New Brunswick